The 2017–18 Ole Miss Rebels women's basketball team represents the University of Mississippi during the 2017–18 NCAA Division I women's basketball season. The Rebels, led by fifth year head coach Matt Insell, play their home games at the Pavilion at Ole Miss and are members of the Southeastern Conference (SEC).

The Rebels finished the season with a 12–19 overall record and a 1–15 record in conference play. On March 2, one day after the Rebels ended their season with a loss to Missouri in the second round of the SEC Tournament, head coach Matt Insell was fired. He finished at Ole Miss with an overall record of 70–87, including an 18–62 record in SEC play.

Previous season
They finished the season 17–14, 6–10 in SEC play to finish in tenth place. They lost in the second round of the SEC women's basketball tournament to LSU. They were invited to the Women's National Invitation Tournament where they got upset by Grambling State in the first round.

Roster

Schedule

|-
!colspan=9 style=| Exhibition

|-
!colspan=9 style=| Non-conference regular season

|-
!colspan=9 style=| SEC regular season

|-
!colspan=9 style=| SEC Women's Tournament

Rankings
2017–18 NCAA Division I women's basketball rankings

See also
•2018 Ole Miss Rebels football team
•2017-18 Ole Miss Rebels men's basketball team
•2018 Ole Miss Rebels baseball team

References

Ole Miss Rebels women's basketball seasons
Ole Miss
Ole Miss Rebels
Ole Miss Rebels